Robert Frodeman is former Professor and former Chair, Dept of Philosophy and Religion, University of North Texas, previously at the University of Colorado, and Director of UNT's Center for the Study of Interdisciplinarity. He publishes in the philosophy of geology, the philosophy of interdisciplinarity, and practical philosophy. Frodeman is now a writer and consultant living in Hoback, Wyoming.

Education
Frodeman attended St. Louis University, where he gained degrees in History and Philosophy (1981), Pennsylvania State University, where he obtained a Ph.D. in Philosophy (1988), studying with Stanley Rosen and Alphonso Lingis, and the University of Colorado, where he was awarded a M.S. degree while studying at INSTAAR.

From 1993 to 2001 Frodeman consulted for the US Geological Survey on questions of science policy, giving lectures to USGS field offices around the country. In 2001-2002, he was the Hennebach Professor of the Humanities at the Colorado School of Mines; in 2005 he was the ESRC Fellow at Lancaster University in England. In 2016 Frodeman served as a member on an Expert Committee on Altmetrics for the European Commission. Since retiring he has written on environmental questions in the American West.

Bibliography

References

External links
 Personal website

1958 births
Living people
21st-century American philosophers
Saint Louis University alumni
Pennsylvania State University alumni
University of Colorado alumni
University of Colorado Boulder faculty
University of North Texas faculty
Environmental ethicists